Elisha Banai (Elisha Banai (born November 18, 1988) is an Israeli singer, musician, songwriter, composer, music producer and Israeli actor, best known as the singer of Elisha Banai and the Forty thieves.

Biography
Banai was born and raised in Tel Aviv to an artistic family. His father is the singer Yuval Banai and his mother is the actress Orly Zilbershatz. His grandfather is Yossi Banai. Banai is the oldest brother of Amalia Banai and Sophie Banai.

In 2007, Elisha joined his youth band "No No Shame" where he was a member for four years.
In 2010 Elisha went on a tour with "Got No Shame" in California. he returned to Israel with materials that he played them for his friend Mati Gilad and they began to play, write, process the songs began to appear and called themselves "Elisha Banai and the forty thieves."

The first album of "Elisha Banai and the Forty thieves" was produced by Eyal Even-Zur. On April 27, 2010, the first single of the first album called "Barcelona" was released. On 1 August 2011 was published and a year later for the release of the album in 2012 began to release singles like "KMO KULAM" "HAKOL NISRAF" and "San Diego," which have been very successful. In 2014, "Elisha Banai and the Forty thieves" released their second album "Speed of Light" which was produced by Peter Roth. From this album they released singles such as "Noga Looking for Justice" and "Einstein" which was very successful. In the year of 2016, Elisha and the thieves released a single called "Rise and wanna Fall".

These days Elisha and the thieves are working on their third studio album.

In February 2018 he released two singles called "MA SHE AT ROTZA" and "Ghost Car" under the name "Marco Polo", a pair he created with actor Eldar Brentman. The video clip was directed by Elisha's sister, Amalia Banai.

Banai lives in Tel Aviv with his girlfriend, actress Sivan Mast.

Albums
2012 - "Elisha Banai and the forty thieves"

2014 - "Speed of light"

Filmography
2013 - "Makimi" as Brenner (HOT3).

2015 - "Apples from the Desert" as Dubi (nominated for Best Supporting Actor Ophir award)

2016 - "Mother's Day" as "Zovik" (Keshet)

2016 - "Bilti Hafich" 2 as Hezi (Reshet).

2016 - "Charlie Golf One" (Tagged) as Roi (Yes).

2017 - "Fullmoon" as Oren (HOT).

2017 - "Nevsu" as Gilad (Reshet).

2018 - "Tsotselet Scouts" as Neria (YES)

2018 - "Trash Talk" Skits (Teddy Channel)

2018 - "Nechama" in guest role as "Davidi" (HOT)

2018 - "The Electrifiers" (HaMechashmelim) as Yotam (OSN Movies and Green Productions)

2019 - "True Hero" (Gibor Amiti) as Bactus (Teddy Productions)

2021 - "Image of Victory" as Elyakim Ben-Ari (Bleiberg Entertainment)

References

1988 births
Elisha
21st-century Israeli male singers
Living people
People from Tel Aviv
Israeli people of Iranian-Jewish descent